The General Counsel of the Department of the Air Force (acronym SAF/GC) is the chief legal officer of the U.S. Department of the Air Force.

By U.S. law, the General Counsel of the Department of the Air Force is appointed from civilian life by the President of the United States upon the advice and consent of the United States Senate, and performs such duties as the Secretary of the Air Force specifies.

According to Secretary of the Air Force Order No. 111.5, dated July 14, 2005, "The General Counsel is the chief legal officer and chief ethics official of the Department of the Air Force. Legal opinions issued by the Office of the General Counsel shall be the controlling opinions of the Department of the Air Force. The General Counsel provides advice in accordance with applicable statues on any legal subject and on other matters as directed by the Secretary."  In other words, the General Counsel of the Air Force advises the Secretary of the Air Force, the Under Secretary of the Air Force, and the Assistant Secretaries of the Air Force, as well as the Chief of Staff of the Air Force, Chief of Space Operations, and other military leaders of the United States Air Force and United States Space Force on legal matters, other than those statutory duties under the Uniform Code of Military Justice performed by the Judge Advocate General of the Air Force.

The current General Counsel of the Department of the Air Force is Peter Beshar, who was sworn in on March 18, 2022.

List of General Counsels of the Department of the Air Force (incomplete list)

See also
 General Counsel of the Department of Defense
 General Counsel of the Army
 General Counsel of the Navy

References

External links
 

United States Air Force
 
Lawyers who have represented the United States government